HMS St Albans was a 50-gun fourth rate ship of the line of the English Royal Navy, launched at Deptford Dockyard in 1687. The ship fought in the Battle of Placentia (1692).

St Albans was wrecked in 1693.

Notes

References

Lavery, Brian (2003) The Ship of the Line - Volume 1: The development of the battlefleet 1650-1850. Conway Maritime Press. .

Ships of the line of the Royal Navy
1680s ships